Alfredo Ugarte (born 1903, date of death unknown) was a Chilean hurdler. He competed in the 110 metres hurdles at the 1924 Summer Olympics and the 1928 Summer Olympics.

References

External links
 

1903 births
Year of death missing
Athletes (track and field) at the 1924 Summer Olympics
Athletes (track and field) at the 1928 Summer Olympics
Chilean male hurdlers
Olympic athletes of Chile
Place of birth missing